Toecrushers is an alternative name for yorker deliveries (usually inswinging ones) in cricket. This term was probably first used by TV commentators in early 1990s to describe the frequent inswinging yorkers bowled by Pakistani fast bowlers Wasim Akram and Waqar Younis. Indian bowlers Jasprit Bumrah and T Natarajan also bowl toecrushers. Toe crushers are said to be much more difficult to play as the ball nips in just before it lands giving it a higher chance for the batsman to miss and get bowled while trying to defend or hit it.

External links 

Cricket terminology